Øyvind Brandtsegg (born 16 February 1971 in Steinkjer, Norway) is a Norwegian musician (percussion, electronica), programmer and composer, known from a series of recordings, and collaborations with such bands as Motorpsycho and Krøyt.

Career 
Brandtsegg studied music at the "Sund folkehøgskole" (Sund Folk High School) in Inderøy. He studied the vibraphone at the Norwegian University of Science and Technology (NTNU) and created a music software program called ImproSculpt, which samples different tones from the environment (including via body sensors) at the same time the music is performed, processes them and generates ever-changing variations in real time. He plays an instrument called the Marimba Lumina, a MIDI-based marimba which allows the players movements affect the sound.

Brandtsegg led his own rock band as young in Steinkjer, and played with fellow students in the bands Krøyt from 1993, and later the Live Maria Roggen Band. He collaborated with Motorpsycho on commissioned work at the Trondheim Jazz Festival in 2006.
Currently Brandtsegg is a professor of music at NTNU.

Honors 
 Spellemannprisen 1999 within Krøyt, for the album Low
 Edvard Prize 2000 within Krøyt for the composition "Silent»

Musical installations 
Meta.Morf 1st exhibition 'Installation for a walking bridge' 2012

Discography

Under his own name 
 2020: Nancarrow Biotope (Crónica Electrónica)

Within Krøyt 
1997: Sub (Curling Legs)
1998: Low (BP)
2001: One Heart Is Too Small (Yonada)
2001: Body Electric EP (MNW)

Collaborative works 
With Motorpsycho
1994: Timothy's Monster (1994)

With Tre Små Kinesere
1996: Tro Håp & Kjærlighet (Columbia Music)

References

External links 

Sound art from outer space: Øyvind Brandtsegg at TEDxTrondheim on YouTube

1971 births
Living people
Musicians from Steinkjer
Norwegian University of Science and Technology alumni
Norwegian jazz vibraphonists
Norwegian percussionists
Norwegian jazz drummers
Male drummers
Norwegian jazz composers
20th-century Norwegian drummers
21st-century Norwegian drummers
Male jazz composers
20th-century Norwegian male musicians
21st-century Norwegian male musicians
Trondheim Jazz Orchestra members
Krøyt members